BMW developed its first electric car based on the 1602 model. The BMW 1602 Elektro-Antrieb was first unveiled at the 1972 Olympic Games in Munich, Germany; two examples were used to shuttle VIPs and serve as support cars in various long-distance events like the marathon.

Specifications

Powertrain
The 1602 Elektro-Antrieb used one  electric motor, front-mounted driving the rear axle. The 1602 elektro is unique in the fact it has a front engine, rear wheel drive layout.

Battery

References

1602
Electric concept cars